Paralacydoniidae is a family of polychaetes belonging to the order Phyllodocida.

Genera:
 Paralacydonia Fauvel, 1913

References

Phyllodocida